Revolution is a double disc album by trance DJ/producer DJ Tiësto, released on May 7, 2001. Disc one is labeled Darkside, while the second CD is labeled Brightside.

Track listing

Disc One (Darkside)
 Delerium - "Innocente (Falling In Love)" [DJ Tiësto Remix] – 5:58
 Leama - "Melodica" – 8:11
 LN Movement - "Golden Desert (Part 2)" – 3:33
 Ben Shaw - "So Strong" – 6:06
 Joker Jam - "Innocence" – 6:34
 Bullitt - "Cried To Dream" [Max Graham Remix] – 5:56
 DJ Dazzle - "From Within" – 5:05
 Hardy Heller & Ray Boye - "Lovin'" [Fred Numf vs. Five Point O Remix] – 4:04
 J.T. Functions - "Running On E" – 3:37
 Wheed Baskin - "Castle Rock" [Fred Numf vs. Five Point O. Remix] – 4:47
 Kamaya Painters - "Wasteland" [Chab Remix] – 6:11
 Ballroom - "Passenger" [Marc O'Tool Remix] – 5:13
 Agnelli & Nelson - "Vegas" [Fear & Loathing Mix] – 3:19
 V-Three - "Zuluu" – 2:50
 The Francesco Farfa  Meets Pleasure Team - "The Search" [Time & Space Mix] – 5:18

Disc Two (Brightside)
 The Auranaut - "People Want To Be Needed" – 5:46
 Three Drives - "Sunset On Ibiza" – 4:22
 Goldenscan - "Sunrise" [Pulser Remix] – 4:43
 Insigma - "Open Your Eyes" – 5:59
 Airwave - "Mysteries Of Life" – 5:03
 Utah Saints - "Lost Vagueness" [Oliver Lieb's Main Mix] – 4:22
 Yahel  &  Eyal Barkan - "Voyage" – 5:16
 Jan Johnston - "Flesh" [DJ Tiësto Mix] – 6:23
 Riva - "Stringer" – 5:43
 Moogwai - "Labyrinth Part 1" – 5:54
 M.I.K.E. - "Sunrise At Palamos" – 4:54
 DJ Tiësto - "Flight 643" – 6:27
 The Green Martian - "Industry" – 3:50
 Planisphere - "Moonshine" – 6:03
 Push - "Strange World" [2000 Remake] – 3:03

Tiësto compilation albums
2001 compilation albums